Jósvafő is a village in Borsod-Abaúj-Zemplén county, Hungary, situated at the confluence of the Jósva, Kecső, and Tohonya streams. The area, now designated Aggteleki National Park, abounds with natural springs and caves. The "old village" of the settlement was declared a landmark site in 1999. The Tengerszem Lake was constructed in the 1930s to power mills and generate power, from a system in the Baradla Cave.

History
The name of the village first appeared on a certificate of 1272, but there is no detailed record until 1399. This was a basic settlement built around a stone church. The old-town part of the settlement survives today, housed in a former central watermill. Many mills were constructed next to the streams which led to much industry being developed in the village. The Kleins constructed the Upper Mill in the Törőfej Valley in 1840. In 1917, a connecting small power plant was built which provided electricity for the inhabitants. The Tengerszem Lake was created in the 1930s along with a new turbine.

Gallery

References

External links 
 Street map 

Jósvafő-település a források és barlangok völgyében (2000)

Populated places in Borsod-Abaúj-Zemplén County